This is a summary of 1979 in music in the United Kingdom, including the official charts from that year. 1979 saw the beginning of several trends in British music. Electropop reached number one in both the singles and albums charts in the form of Gary Numan and Tubeway Army, and synthesiser bands began to gather momentum which would come to dominate music in the early 1980s. The first rap hit in the UK came from the Sugar Hill Gang. The 2 Tone movement also emerged, with early work from bands such as The Specials and Madness. Disco music was still the most popular music of the year, although it showed signs of dying out in the year's later months. 1979 remains the year when physical-format singles hit their sales peak in the UK.

Events
23 February - Dire Straits begin their first American tour, in Boston.
27 March - Eric Clapton marries Patti Boyd, ex-wife of Clapton's friend George Harrison.
31 March - In the Eurovision Song Contest, UK representatives Black Lace finish seventh.
2 April - Kate Bush begins her first live tour, The Tour of Life. It remains her only tour, and would be her only live shows for 35 years until her Before the Dawn shows at the Hammersmith Apollo in 2014.
6 April - Rod Stewart marries Alana Hamilton.
1 May - Elton John becomes the first overseas pop music artist to perform in Israel.
2 May - The Who perform their first concert following the death of drummer Keith Moon. The band performed with new drummer Kenney Jones.
11 August - Led Zeppelin play their last ever British concert at Knebworth in Hertfordshire.
21 August - Cliff Richard achieves his tenth UK number-one with "We Don't Talk Anymore", his first chart-topper in over 11 years.
August - Brotherhood of Man members Martin Lee and Sandra Stevens marry.
26 November - Bill Haley & His Comets perform at the Drury Lane Theatre in London in a command performance for the Queen. This was Haley's final recorded performance of "Rock Around the Clock".
date unknown
The Welsh Philharmonia becomes the Orchestra of Welsh National Opera.
Richard Rodney Bennett becomes a resident of New York City.
Arthur Oldham founds the Concertgebouw Orchestra Chorus in Amsterdam.

Charts

Number one singles

Number one albums

Year-end charts
1979 appears to be the only year since 1977 for which "full year" year-end charts do not exist. The British Market Research Bureau (BMRB), which compiled the official UK charts from 1969 to 1982, used a cut-off date for the collection of sales data sometime in early December each year, in order for the "end of year" chart to be published in the year's final issue of Music Week and to be broadcast on BBC Radio 1. However, from 1977 to 1982 BMRB produced updated charts a few months later which included the missing final weeks' sales for each year.

No updated chart appears to exist for 1979, so the tables below include only sales between 1 January and 8 December 1979. The two singles most affected by the lack of a full year chart are the records that were at number one and number two for the final three weeks of the year, "Another Brick in the Wall (Part 2)" by Pink Floyd and "I Have a Dream" by ABBA: neither of these records appear in the end of year list for 1979.

Best-selling singles

Best-selling albums

Notes:

Classical music: new works
William Lloyd Webber - Missa Sanctae Mariae Magdalenae
Malcolm Williamson - Symphony No. 5 - Aquerò

Opera
Peter Maxwell Davies - The Lighthouse

Film and Incidental music
Richard Rodney Bennett - Yanks directed by John Schlesinger, starring Richard Gere and Vanessa Redgrave.
Geoffrey Burgon - Monty Python's Life of Brian.

Musical theatre
Andrew Lloyd Webber - Tell Me on a Sunday
Stephen Sondheim & Hugh Wheeler - Sweeney Todd: The Demon Barber of Fleet Street (premièred on Broadway)

Musical films
The Music Machine
The Who - Quadrophenia

Births
5 January
Steve Scott-Lee, singer (3SL)
Michelle Barber, singer (Girl Thing)
19 January - Wiley, record producer and MC
20 January - Will Young, singer and winner of Pop Idol (series 1)
23 January - Vicky Dowdall, singer (Girls@Play)
8 March - Tom Chaplin, singer (Keane)
12 March - Pete Doherty, singer and guitarist (The Libertines and Babyshambles)
30 March - Simon Webbe, singer (Blue)
10 April - Sophie Ellis-Bextor, singer
11 April - Paul Byrom, Irish tenor
13 April - Tony Lundon, Irish singer (Liberty X)
29 April 
 Jo O'Meara, singer (S Club 7)
 Matt Tong (Bloc Party)
3 May - Danny Foster, singer (Hear'Say)
23 May - Lisa-Jay White, singer (Girls@Play)
31 May - Sarah Class, composer
8 June - Adam de la Cour, musician and composer
29 June - Abz Love, singer (5ive)
4 July - Nikki Stuart, singer (Girl Thing)
5 July – Shane Filan, Irish singer (Westlife)
19 July - Michelle Heaton, singer (Liberty X)
20 July – Charlotte Hatherley, singer-songwriter and guitarist (Ash and Nightnurse)
20 August - Jamie Cullum, jazz pianist and singer
23 August - Ritchie Neville, singer (5ive)
5 September - Garry O'Meara, Irish singer (Reel)
8 October - Alexander Shelley, conductor
22 November - Scott Robinson, singer (5ive)
28 November - Dane Bowers, singer (Another Level, 5th Story)
3 December - Daniel Bedingfield, pop singer and songwriter
15 December - Edele and Keavy Lynch, Irish singers (B*Witched)

Deaths
2 February - Sid Vicious, punk rocker, 21 (drug overdose)
4 March - Mike Patto, rock vocalist, 36 (throat cancer)
24 May - Sir Ernest Bullock, organist and composer, 88
16 July - Alfred Deller, countertenor, 67
25 August - Stan Kenton, bandleader, 67
4 September - Guy Bolton, librettist, 94
6 September - Ronald Binge, composer and arranger, 69
9 September - Norrie Paramor, record producer, composer, arranger, and orchestral conductor, 65
27 September - Gracie Fields, actress and singer, 81
13 October - Rebecca Helferich Clarke, viola player and composer, 93
6 November - Hugh Ottaway, music writer, 54
30 November - Joyce Grenfell, actress and musical performer, 69
December - Terence Judd, pianist, 22 (probable suicide)
21 December - Nansi Richards, harpist, 91

See also
 1979 in British radio
 1979 in British television
 1979 in the United Kingdom
 List of British films of 1979

References

 
British Music, 1979 In
British music by year